Peter Delvin Haughton (September 22, 1954 – January 25, 1980) was an American harness driver. He was the son of United States Harness Racing Hall of Fame inductee Billy Haughton.

Racing career 
Haughton made his first competitive drive at 16. He won the race driving Dr. Dewars. In the eight-year career that followed, Peter won a total of 571 races and more than $6 million in purses. In 1974 he won Prix d'Été on Blue Bonnets Raceway with Armbro Omaha. He was especially successful in big stake races, taking the Roosevelt International Trot twice, with Cold Comfort in 1978 and with Doublemint in 1979.

Haughton also won the Dexter Cup and the Zweig Memorial with Cold Comfort. In the 1976 Kentucky Futurity, Peter spoiled his father Bill's Triple Crown bid with Steve Lobell by nosing him out in the fourth heat with Quick Pay.

Death 
Peter Haughton died in an automobile accident in East Rutherford, New Jersey on January 25, 1980. He was inducted in the United States Harness Racing Hall of Fame in 1981. Since 1981, the race Peter Haughton Memorial is run at the Meadowlands Racetrack.

Major racing wins

References

1954 births
1980 deaths
People from Amityville, New York
American harness racing drivers
United States Harness Racing Hall of Fame inductees
Road incident deaths in New Jersey